Antoni Amirowicz (29 August 1904 – 9 November 1993) was a Polish footballer. He played in one match for the Poland national football team in 1924.

References

External links
 

1904 births
1993 deaths
Polish footballers
Poland international footballers
Association football forwards
MKS Cracovia (football) players
Legia Warsaw players